Alfred Edward Chalon  (15 February 1780 – 3 October 1860) was a Swiss-born British portraitist. He lived in London where he was noticed by Queen Victoria.

Biography 

Alfred Chalon was born in Geneva from a father who soon was hired as professor at the Royal Military College, Sandhurst, in England.

With his brother John James Chalon (1778–1854), Alfred became an artist. Entered at the Royal Academy in 1797, he joined the Associated Artists in Water-Colours, a group of aquarellists. In the Academy, he was elected an associate (ARA) in 1812, then academician (RA) in 1816.

Known for his portraits of the good society of London, he was chosen by Queen Victoria to paint a gift to her mother: Victoria in her State robes going to the House of Lords for her first official act, the prorogation of the Parliament, on 17 July 1837. After this task, Chalon was entitled Portrait Painter in Water Colour to Her Majesty and gained some celebrity. His 1837 portrait was engraved by Samuel Cousins and distributed to the public the day of Victoria's coronation, the 28 June 1838. Then, starting in 1851, the "Chalon head" appeared on some British colonies postage stamps.

Bachelors, the Chalon brothers lived together. In 1860, Alfred died at Campden Hill, in Kensington, London and was buried with his brother in Highgate Cemetery.

References

Further reading

External links 

 
 Biography, Library and Archives Canada, retrieved 29 December 2007.
A E Chalon online (ArtCyclopedia)
 Portraits by Alfred Chalon, National Portrait Gallery of London.
 Portrait of a beautiful Arvanit girl by Alfred Chalon (in the Albanian Wikipedia)
 Profile on Royal Academy of Arts Collections
 The painting  with a poetical illustration by Letitia Elizabeth Landon in The Keepsake, 1833.
 , a painting of a scene from the opera La muette de Portici by Daniel Auber, engraved by J. C. Edwards for The Keepsake annual, 1836, with a poetical illustration (Fenella’s Escape) by Letitia Elizabeth Landon.
 Paintings for Finden's Gallery of the Graces, 1834:
  engraved by John Henry Robinson, with a poetical illustration by Letitia Elizabeth Landon (The Ladye Adeline).
  engraved by Richard Austin Artlett, also with a poetical illustration by Letitia Elizabeth Landon.
 , engraved by E. J. Portbury for The Cabinet of Modern Art, 1837, with a poetical illustration by Letitia Elizabeth Landon
 Portraits in Heath's book of Beauty, 1839, with illustrative verse by Letitia Elizabeth Landon:
 , engraved by William Henry Mote
 , engraved by William Henry Mote

19th-century British painters
British male painters
British watercolourists
Royal Academicians
British portrait painters
1780 births
1860 deaths
Burials at Highgate Cemetery
19th-century British male artists